Agathia pisina is a species of moth of the family Geometridae first described by Arthur Gardiner Butler in 1887. It is found in Australia (including Queensland) and Norfolk Island.

Adults are green with brown markings. The hindwings have a cusp halfway along the margin. There is also a brown cusp white spot at each hindwing tornus.

The larvae feed on Gymnanthera oblonga.

References

Moths described in 1887
Geometrinae
Moths of Australia